Enpi may refer to:

Enpi (elbow strike), a Japanese martial arts term meaning "elbow strike"
Enpi (kata), a kata found in Shotokan and other karate styles
ENPI, European Neighbourhood and Partnership Instrument, the funding instrument of the European Union's European Neighbourhood Policy

See also
EMPI (disambiguation)
NP (disambiguation)